Mount Lloyd is a mountain in the Holland Range, Antarctica, standing  high north of the head of Hewitt Glacier,  north of Mount Miller. It was discovered and named by the British Antarctic Expedition (1907–09).

References

Mountains of the Ross Dependency
Shackleton Coast